The Winnipeg Monarchs were a Canadian junior ice hockey team that competed in the Manitoba Junior Hockey League from 1930 to 1978.

History
The Winnipeg Monarchs junior team was founded in 1930.  From 1930 to 1936, they co-existed with the Winnipeg Monarchs senior hockey team.  The junior Monarchs won the Memorial Cup as Canadian Junior Hockey Champions three times, in 1935, 1937 and 1946. In 1946, George Robertson scored the winning goal in the seventh game of the 1946 Memorial Cup Final before a sell out crowd at Maple Leaf Gardens in Toronto, Ontario.   The Monarchs were also finalists in 1932, losing to Sudbury Wolves in the final, and 1951, losing to the Barrie Flyers.

In addition the three Memorial Cup titles, the team won ten Turnbull Cups as Manitoba Junior Hockey League champions and five Abbott Cups as Western Canadian junior hockey champions.  The Monarchs are inducted into the Manitoba Hockey Hall of Fame in the team category four times (1932, 1937, 1946, 1951).

The club changed its name to the Assiniboine Park Monarchs in 1975, but reverted to the original name two years later. A group of Winnipeg businessmen purchased the Monarchs following the 1978 season and relocated it to Fort Garry in south Winnipeg.  As part of the move, the team was renamed the Fort Garry Blues.  The club has since relocated to Oak Bluff, Manitoba, just outside of Winnipeg, and is currently known as the Winnipeg Blues.

Championships
Turnbull Cup: 1932, 1935, 1937, 1945, 1946, 1948, 1951, 1952, 1955, 1957
Abbott Cup: 1932, 1935, 1937, 1946, 1951
Memorial Cup: 1935, 1937, 1946

The 1932 Winnipeg Monarchs won the 1932 Abbott Cup, defeating the Saskatoon Wesleys. They went on to lose the Memorial Cup to the Sudbury Cub Wolves at Shea's Amphitheater in Winnipeg. The roster was: Tony Lemay, Victor Lindquist, Romeo Rivers, Cam Shewan, Art Rice-Jones, Roy Hinkle, Norm Yellowlees, Archie Creighton, Albert Lemay, and Joe Rivers.

The  1935 Winnipeg Monarchs won their first Memorial Cup, in a best-of-three series  held at Shea's Amphitheatre in Winnipeg, defeating Sudbury 2 games to 1.

The 1937 Winnipeg Monarchs were a small speedy team that surprised many on their way to the Abbott and Memorial Cup championships. Team Roster: Harry Neil (Coach), Bill Webber (Manager), Bert Pelletier (Trainer), Jack Atchison, Harvey Field, Dick Kowcinak, Lucien Martel, John McCreedy, Alf Pike, Paul Rheault, Denny Robinson, Ted Dent, Jack Fox, Pete Langelle, Remi Van Dale, Ami Clement, Zeke Farley, Bobby Summers (Stick Boy). After the 1937 Memorial Cup, the Monarchs played in an international series arranged by the Canadian Amateur Hockey Association to determind a world's amateur champion. The tournament was shortened due to poor attendance, and the game between Winnipeg and the Hershey Bears was cancelled as both teams went home early.

The 1946 Winnipeg Monarchs defeated the Edmonton Canadians to capture the Abbott Cup. They went on to beat the Toronto St. Michael's Majors 4-2 in the seventh and deciding game of the Memorial Cup.  Roster: Jack Gibson, Tom Rockey, Laurie May, Al Buchanan (Captain), George Robertson, Harry Taylor, Don "Red" McRae, Clint Albright, Gord Fashoway, Eddie Marchant, Tom "Tank" Kummerfield, Hy Beatty, Cam Millar, Bill Tindall, Dunc Daniels, Gord Scott, Ted Chitty, Walter Monson (Coach), Pat Lyon (GM), Floyd Howe (President), Ed Haverstock (Trainer), Bill Windatt (Equipment Manager).

The 1951 Winnipeg Monarchs won the Abbott Cup by defeating the Regina Pats. They went on to lose the Memorial Cup to the Barrie Flyers.

Season-by-season record
Note: GP = Games Played, W = Wins, L = Losses, T = Ties, OTL = Overtime Losses, GF = Goals for, GA = Goals against

References

External links
Winnipeg Blues Official Website
1932 Winnipeg Monarchs at Manitoba Hockey Hall of Fame
1937 Winnipeg Monarchs at Manitoba Hockey Hall of Fame
1946 Winnipeg Monarchs at Manitoba Hockey Hall of Fame
1951 Winnipeg Monarchs at Manitoba Hockey Hall of Fame

Defunct Manitoba Junior Hockey League teams
Winnipeg Monarchs